Aekkaphop Saensra is a Thai footballer.

Honours

Clubs
Buriram United
 U-19 Thailand Championship Champions ; 2012
 U-19 Thailand Championship MVP ; 2012

References 

1994 births
Living people
Aekkaphop Saensra
Aekkaphop Saensra
Aekkaphop Saensra
Aekkaphop Saensra
Aekkaphop Saensra
Association football forwards